The 2018 AIBA Youth World Boxing Championships were held in Budapest, Hungary, from 21 to 31 August. The competition is under the supervision of the world's governing body for amateur boxing,  AIBA, and is the youth and junior version of the World Amateur Boxing Championships. The competition was open to boxers born in 2000 and 2001. It was the second time in the tournament's history that men and women fought in the same championship.

Medal summary

Men

Women

Medal table

References

Youth World Amateur Boxing Championships
Youth, 2018
2018 in Hungarian sport
International sports competitions in Budapest
August 2018 sports events in Europe
2010s in Budapest